Trio Nunataks is a three large nunataks standing at the south side of David Glacier, just west of the terminus of Hollingsworth Glacier, in Victoria Land. Named by the Southern Party of the New Zealand Geological Survey Antarctic Expedition (NZGSAE), 1962–63.

Nunataks of Victoria Land
Scott Coast